MongoDB, Inc. is an American software company that develops and provides commercial support for the source-available database MongoDB, a NoSQL database that stores data in JSON-like documents with flexible schemas.

History

The company was first established in 2007 as 10gen. Based in New York City, 10gen was founded by former DoubleClick founder and CTO Dwight Merriman and former DoubleClick CEO and Gilt Groupe founder Kevin P. Ryan with former Doubleclick engineer and ShopWiki founder and CTO Eliot Horowitz and received $81 million in venture capital funding from Flybridge Capital Partners, In-Q-Tel, Intel Capital, New Enterprise Associates (NEA), Red Hat, Sequoia Capital, and Union Square Ventures. 10gen originally aimed to build a platform as a service architecture based entirely on open source components; however, the company was unable to find an existing database platform that met their "principles" for a cloud architecture. As a result, the company began to develop a document-oriented database system it called MongoDB. After realizing the potential of the software on its own, 10gen's team decided to scrap its cloud platform and focus on maintaining MongoDB instead. In February 2009, 10gen released MongoDB as an open source project. 10gen opened its first west coast office in August 2010, having offices in Palo Alto, Reston, London, Dublin, Barcelona, and Sydney by 2012.

In September 2012, 10gen was in The Wall Street Journal's The Next Big Thing 2012.

On August 27, 2013, 10gen announced that it would change its name to MongoDB Inc., associating itself more closely with what ultimately became its flagship products.

On August 5, 2014, Dev Ittycheria was appointed president and chief executive officer.

The company's initial public offering was on October 20, 2017, and a secondary offering was held on June 29, 2021.

CIA backing concern

MongoDB Inc., then known as 10gen, has received funding from the U.S. Government through the CIA-sponsored venture capital arm In-Q-Tel. This has been a source of concern in India.

References

Companies based in New York City
NoSQL companies
Cloud computing providers
Software companies based in New York (state)
Cloud infrastructure
2017 initial public offerings
Software companies of the United States